The California brackish water snail, also known as the mimic tryonia, scientific name Tryonia imitator, is a species of very small brackish water snails that have an operculum, aquatic gastropod mollusks in the family Hydrobiidae.

This species is endemic to the United States.

References

Endemic fauna of the United States
Tryonia
Gastropods described in 1899
Taxonomy articles created by Polbot